The Kawasaki Ki-100 (キ100) is a single-seat single-engine monoplane fighter aircraft used by the Imperial Japanese Army Air Service during World War II. It was not assigned an Allied code name.

275 Ki-100s were modified from Ki-61s as an emergency measure to accept a 14-cylinder Mitsubishi Ha-112-II radial engine in place of the original Kawasaki Ha-40 inverted V-12 inline engine which resulted in one of the best interceptors used by the Army during the war. It combined excellent power and maneuverability, and from the first operational missions in March 1945 until the end of the war, it performed better than most IJAAF fighters against both United States Army Air Forces Boeing B-29 Superfortress bombers and North American P-51 Mustang fighters as well as U.S. Navy Grumman F6F Hellcat carrier fighters.

A newly built variant, the Ki-100-Ib, was produced with a cut down rear fuselage during the last months of the war which equipped five home defence sentai. High-altitude performance was further improved with the final variant, the Ki-100-II, however only three of these were produced before the war ended and this final variant never saw operational service.

Design and development
The Ki-100 was a stressed-skin cantilever low-wing single-seat enclosed-cockpit radial engine monoplane fighter with retractable undercarriage. Control surfaces were fabric covered.

Ki-61 engine problems
In mid-1944, the Ki-61 was one of the best fighters of the Imperial Japanese Army Air Service. It was also the only production Japanese fighter to have an inline powerplant, the V-12 Kawasaki Ha-40, a Japanese adaptation of the German Daimler-Benz DB 601 engine, as well as one of the first with factory-installed armor and self-sealing fuel tanks. It also had a respectable performance, in line with contemporary American designs, with speed and rate of climb emphasized instead of manoeuvrability and range. It was an effective design, but suffered from engine shortages and reliability problems. These problems led to the development of an improved model, the Ki-61-II (later Ki-61-II-KAI), powered by the improved  Kawasaki Ha-140 inverted V-12 engine, which was heavier than the Ha-40 it replaced. However, it never performed as expected due to continued quality control problems with the engine, while far fewer engines were produced than required.

Ha-112 Radial engine
At this point of the war, the IJAAF was in desperate need of effective interceptors to stop bombing raids over the Japanese mainland, so in October 1944 a decision was made to use the   Mitsubishi Ha-112-II (Kinsei ["Venus"] 60 series), a 14-cylinder, two-row radial engine. The need for a new engine became urgent on 19 January 1945, when a bombing raid destroyed the Ha-140 production plant, leaving 275 otherwise complete Ki-61s engineless.

The Mitsubishi Ha-112-II was  lighter than the Ha-140 and developed the same power but with much greater reliability. Three Ki-61-II-KAIs were modified to carry this engine as prototypes. Chief engineer Takeo Doi with two other engineers redesigned the Ki-61 airframe to accept the new engine. Their solution was to use a second skin to form a fairing riveted to the fuselage to smooth out the airflow behind the cooling flaps and multiple exhaust stubs of the new engine cowling. As this engine was lighter, they were able to remove the lead counterweight in the tail that balanced out the heavier Ha-140 engine.

The new model was flown for the first time on 1 February 1945. Without the need for the heavy coolant radiator and other fittings required for a liquid-cooled engine, the Ki-100 was  lighter than the Ki-61-II, reducing the wing loading from 189 kg/m2 (38.8 lb/ft2) to 175 kg/m2 (35.8 lb/ft2). This had a positive effect on the flight characteristics, enhancing landing and takeoff qualities as well as improving manoeuvrability and reducing the turning radius. During March and April 1945, experienced instructors from the Akeno Army Flying School flew the Ki-100 in extensive tests against the Ki-84, which was the best JAAF fighter then in operational service. Their conclusions were that, given pilots of equal experience, the Ki-100 would always win in combat.

The company's designation for it was Ki-100-I-Ko. All Ki-100-I-Ko were converted from existing Ki-61-II Kai and Ki-61-III airframes. The integral engine mount and cowling was cut off and a tubular steel engine mount was bolted to the firewall. Some redundant fittings from the liquid-cooled engine, such as the radiator shutter actuator, were left in place. The first 271 aircraft with the original faired rear fuselage were rolled out of the factory between March and June 1945.

In contrast to the unreliable engines used by the Kawanishi N1K-J, Kawasaki Ki-61 and Nakajima Ki-84 that were keeping many of these aircraft grounded, the new  engine was much more reliable. Although its maximum speed in level flight was a bit slow for 1945, the Ki-100 could dive with North American P-51 Mustangs and maintain speed after pullout, unlike most Japanese fighters.
Two remaining problems continued to hamper Japanese fighters towards the end of the war, these being unreliable electrical systems and poor radio equipment, and while the latter was never resolved, the Ki-100's electrical system was less of a problem than with other types.

The armament remained the same as was used on the Ki-61, which was two
cowl-mounted  calibre Ho-5 cannons, with 200 rounds per gun complemented by two wing-mounted  Ho-103 machine guns with 250 rounds per gun.

Fuselage improvements
The Ki-100-I-Otsu were newly built as such, rather than being conversions, with a cut-down rear fuselage and improved canopy and 118 were produced from May through to the end of July 1945. This version also featured a modified oil cooler under the engine in a more streamlined fairing.

High altitude improvements
The Ki-100-II was fitted with a turbocharged water-methanol injected engine for improved high-altitude performance, mainly to improve interception capabilities against the Boeing B-29 Superfortresses, but only three prototypes were built, and none were used operationally. Due to a lack of space, no intercooler was installed, however performance was still enhanced above .

Operational history
The Ki-100 made its combat debut on the night of 9 March 1945 and suffered its first loss a month later on the night of 7 April 1945, when a single Ki-100 of the 18th Sentai was downed by a B-29 Superfortress after "attacking the formation again and again". Allied aircrews soon realised that they were facing a formidable new fighter. Although far fewer Ki-100s were available than Nakajima Ki-84s, it was an important fighter in the Army's inventory. A well-handled Ki-100 was able to outmanoeuvre any American fighter, including the P-51D Mustangs and Republic P-47N Thunderbolts which escorted the B-29s over Japan, and was comparable in speed, especially at medium altitudes. The Ki-100 was a tough opponent in the hands of an experienced pilot. The Ki-100 along with the Army's Nakajima Ki-84 and the Navy's Kawanishi N1K-J were equal to the latest Allied types in the final year of the Pacific War.

Army fighter units equipped with this model included the  5th, 17th, 18th, 20th, 59th, 111th, 112th, 200th and 244th Sentai, and the 81st Independent Fighter Company. Pilots were trained at the Akeno and Hitachi (Mito) Army Flying Schools. Many Akeno and Hitachi instructors were from operational units and between training sorties they also flew combat missions, making the most of the few fighters that were operational, but these wings were only partially re-equipped.

During interception of high-flying B-29 Superfortresses (before the B-29s switched to low-level missions) the new fighters struggled as the engine's performance still dropped off at high altitudes. The most effective strategy against the B-29 Superfortress remained the exceedingly dangerous head-on attack, which left the fighter relatively stationary in the sights of the bomber's defensive guns, making it an easy target. In this type of combat, the Navy's Mitsubishi J2M Raiden remained superior.

111th Sentai Ki-100s intercepted B-29 Superfortresses attacking Kobe on 5 June 1945, claiming six bombers shot down and five 'probables'. The Americans recorded a loss of nine B-29s, including those downed by Ki-100s over the target area. Ki-100s of the same unit joined by 244th Sentai Ki-84s in a large-scale engagement against 506th Fighter Group P-51 Mustangs over Nagoya Bay on 16 July 1945. The Ki-100 pilots claimed six P-51s and in return, five Ki-100s were lost, with three pilots killed, although American records only show one loss.

On 25 July 1945, 18 244th Sentai Ki-100 fighters clashed with 10 VF-31 Grumman F6F Hellcats from the light aircraft carrier  in an air battle where the Ki-100 pilots claimed 12 victories with two losses. Claims and counter-claims for this action remain contentious. The Americans claimed two Ki-100s and admitted to losing two VF-31 F6F-5 Hellcats. These include a Ki-100 and a Hellcat which collided, killing both pilots.

After the bombing of the Kagamigahara plant and the slow deliveries of components by satellite plants, the production rate of the Ki-100 declined, and between May and July, only 12 were delivered. Bombing would end production with only 118 of the Army Type 5 Fighter Model 1b having been delivered.

The final flights made by the Imperial Japanese Army Air Service were made by two Ki-100s ferried from Komachi to Yokosuka, where they were handed over to the United States, who then shipped them back to the US for evaluation.

Variants
 Ki-100 (prototypes): Kawasaki Ki-61 II KAI modified with a radial engine. 3 converted from Ki-61s.
 Ki-100-I-Ko: initial production variant, modified from Ki-61 II KAI. 271 converted from Ki-61s.
 Ki-100-I-Otsu: improved canopy and cut down rear fuselage. 118 built.
 Ki-100-II (prototypes): powered with a  Mitsubishi Ha-112-II Ru fitted with a turbocharger. 3 built.
 Army Fighter Type 5 Mark Ia: IJA designation for Ki-100-I-Ko
 Army Fighter Type 5 Mark Ib: IJA designation for Ki-100-I-Otsu

Production

Note:
 Production on the Kagamigahara and Ichinomiya aircraft plant were severely hampered by Allied bombing raids. It was planned to produce 200 airframes per month, but the Ichinomiya plant had to be abandoned after its nearly complete destruction.

Not included:
 Three Ki-100-I prototypes were completed in February 1945.
 Three Ki-100-II prototypes were completed during May to June 1945.
 Twelve additional Ki-100-I-Otsu were built at the Ichinomiya aircraft plant.

Operators

 Imperial Japanese Army Air Service

Surviving aircraft
 Kawasaki Ki-100-1b s/n 8476M was captured at Tân Sơn Nhứt Airfield, Saigon, in August 1945 in airworthy condition, having only recently been delivered. However it was damaged there on 26 Nov 1945 during a wheels-up landing, after the undercarriage failed to lower for an attempted landing at Biên Hòa airfield, 15 miles away; it was being ferried there by a Japanese pilot for flight tests. The oil cooler, propeller, and tailwheel were repaired but not returned to complete airworthy condition; it was later shipped to the United Kingdom along with three other Japanese aircraft including a Mitsubishi A6M Zero (Zeke) fuselage, a Mitsubishi Ki-46 (Dinah) and a Nippon Kokusai Ki-86 (Cyprus). After years of being in storage in various locations, and being misidentified as a Nakajima Ki-43 (Oscar), it was restored was on display at the RAF Museum in Hendon, United Kingdom. Moved to RAF Museum Cosford on 30 January 2012, though now relocated again to the Hendon museum as of December 2022.

Specifications (Ki-100-I-Ko/Otsu Goshikisen )

See also

References

Citations

Bibliography
 Bueschel, Richard M. Kawasaki Ki.61/Ki.100 Hien in Japanese Army Air Force Service, Aircam Aviation Series No.21. Canterbury, Kent, UK: Osprey Publications Ltd, 1971. .
 Craven, Wesley and Cate, James The Army Air Forces in World War II Volume Five The Pacific: Matterhorn to Nagasaki June 1944 to August 1945 Chicago: The University of Chicago Press, 1953. ASIN: B000LZHT7Q
 Ethell, Jeffrey L. Aircraft of World War II. Glasgow, Collins Jane's, 1995. .
 Francillon, René J. Japanese Aircraft of the Pacific War. London: Putnam, 1970. .
 Francillon, René J. Japanese Aircraft of the Pacific War. London: Putnam, 2nd edition, 1979. .
 Green, William. Warplanes of the Second World War, Volume Three: Fighters. London: Macdonald & Co. (Publishers) Ltd., 1961 (seventh impression 1973). .
 Green, William and Gordon Swanborough. WW2 Aircraft Fact Files: Japanese Army Fighters, Part 1. London: Macdonald and Jane's, 1976. .
 
 "The Last Swallow of Summer...The Extraordinary Story of the Ki-100" Air International, October 1976, Volume 11, Number 4, pp.185–191. Bromley, UK: Fine Scroll.
 Millman, Nicholas. Ki-61 and Ki-100 Aces. Bloomsbury Publishing, 2015. .
 Mondey, David. The Hamlyn Concise Guide to Axis Aircraft of World War II. London: Bounty Books, 2006. .
 Picarella, Giuseppe. "Database: Kawasaki Ki-100. Article, scale drawings and cutaway." Aeroplane, Volume 33, No 11, Issue No 391, November 2005. London: IPC Media Ltd.
 Sakaida, Henry. Japanese Army Air Force Aces 1937–45. Botley, Oxford, UK: Osprey Publishing, 1997. .
 Sakurai, Takashi. Rikugun Hiko Dai 244 Sentai Shi History of the Army 244 Group (in Japanese). Tokyo: Soubunsha, 1995. ISBN unknown.
 Sakurai, Takashi. Hien Fighter Group: A Pictorial History of the 244th Sentai, Tokyo's Defenders(in Japanese/English). Tokyo: Dai Nippon Kaga, 2004. ISBN unknown.
 Sgarlato, Nico. "Ki-100: il FW-190 Giapponese" (in Italian). Aerei Nella Storia N. 51. 1996.
 United States Strategic Bombing Survey Aircraft Division. Kawasaki Aircraft Company, Ltd. Corporation Report IV, Washington, D.C. 1947.
 

Ki-100, Kawasaki
Ki-100,Kawasaki
Ki-100
Single-engined tractor aircraft
Aircraft first flown in 1945